Herre Church is a parish church of the Church of Norway in Bamble Municipality in Vestfold og Telemark county, Norway. It is located in the village of Herre. It is one of the churches for the Bamble og Herre parish which is part of the Bamble prosti (deanery) in the Diocese of Agder og Telemark. The white, wooden church was built in a long church design in 1905 using plans drawn up by the architect Haldor Larsen Børve. The church seats about 275 people.

History
In the latter half of the 19th century, local residents of Herre began working towards getting an annex chapel built in their village, rather than having to travel to Bamble Church. After a factory opened and attracted more residents to Herre, the desire for a local chapel became possible. The factory provided land for a cemetery and chapel. The cemetery was consecrated on 2 January 1898. Work next moved to the construction of the new chapel building. The chapel was designed by Haldor Larsen Børve and O. Thovsen was the lead builder with Tollef Veholt being responsible for the masonry work. The new chapel (called Herre Chapel at that time) was consecrated on 1 November 1905. The new building was a wooden long church that was designed using the inspiration of a medieval stave church. An additional  was collected from the people of the village. Initially, the building was titled as a "chapel", but in 1997, the church was upgraded to the status of a parish church and re-titled Herre Church.

Media gallery

See also
List of churches in Agder og Telemark

References

Bamble
Churches in Vestfold og Telemark
Long churches in Norway
Wooden churches in Norway
20th-century Church of Norway church buildings
Churches completed in 1905
1905 establishments in Norway